Argelliers is a commune in the Hérault department in southern France.

See also
Communes of the Hérault department

References

External links

 

Communes of Hérault